is a retired welterweight Greco-Roman wrestler from Japan. He competed at the 1964 Summer Olympics in Tokyo, but was eliminated by Bertil Nyström in the third round.

References

1940 births
Living people
Olympic wrestlers of Japan
Wrestlers at the 1964 Summer Olympics
Japanese male sport wrestlers
20th-century Japanese people